Oreomava otwayensis is a species of small air-breathing land snail, a terrestrial pulmonate gastropod mollusk in the family Charopidae. This species is endemic to Australia.

References

Gastropods of Australia
Oreomava
Vulnerable fauna of Australia
Gastropods described in 1879
Taxonomy articles created by Polbot